The La Transat en Double formally known as the Transat AG2R is a two person transatlantic race which is held biannually in one design Beneteau Figaro boats. The present iteration being the Beneteau Figaro 3.

Winners

Editions

1992

1994

1996

1998

2000

2002

2004

2006

2008

2010

2012

2014

2016

2018

2021
This was the first edition to use the new Beneteau Figaro 3 and was delayed by 12 months from 2020 to 2021 due to the COVID-19 pandemic. The race was renamed to "Transat en Double - Concarneau - Saint-Barthélemy".

References

External links
Official Website

1992 establishments in France
Recurring sporting events established in 1992
Sailing competitions in France
Yachting races
Transatlantic sailing competitions
Two person offshore sailing event